Paul Williams (born 16 November 1964) is an English professional darts player.

Career
Williams played in six BDO World Championships between 1995 and 2000, reaching the quarter-finals on two occasions, and played in four PDC World Championships between 2002 and 2005, reaching the last 16 in 2005.

World Championship performances

BDO
 1995: Quarter-Finals: (lost to Andy Fordham 2–4) (sets)
 1996: Last 32: (lost to John Part 2–3)
 1997: Quarter-Finals: (lost to Les Wallace 0–4)
 1998: Last 32: (lost to Steve Beaton 1–3)
 1999: Last 16: (lost to Andy Fordham 0–3)
 2000: Last 32: (lost to Kevin Painter 1–3)

PDC
 2002: Last 32: (lost to Phil Taylor 1–4)
 2003: Last 40: (lost to Simon Whitlock 2–4)
 2004: Last 32: (lost to Kevin Painter 3–4)
 2005: Last 16: (lost to Wayne Mardle 3–4)

References

External links

1964 births
Living people
English darts players
Professional Darts Corporation former pro tour players
British Darts Organisation players